Víctor Alberto Figueroa (born 29 September 1983 in San Isidro) is an Argentine football midfielder who currently plays for Aucas.

Career
Figueroa started his career at Chacarita Juniors in the Primera Division Argentina in 2002. At the end of the 2003-2004 season Chacarita were relegated to the Argentine 2nd Division. Figueroa stayed at the club and became a regular starter for the team.

In 2006, he played for K.F.C. Germinal Beerschot in Belgium and in 2007 he played for Sarmiento before returning to Chacarita Juniors. In 2008, he was loaned to 
Godoy Cruz which plays in the Primera División Argentina. In 2009, he signed a contract with and played for Saudi Club Al-Nassr.

On 15 July 2011 Figueroa signed for Newell's Old Boys. On 20 January 2016 he was loaned out to Club Atlético Colón on a 5-month deal.

Honours
Newell's Old Boys
Primera División: 2013 Final
Copa Libertadores da América: 1992

External links
 Official Club Player Profile 
 
 Víctor Figueroa at BDFA.com.ar 
 Player profile on the Beerschot Website 
 

1983 births
Living people
People from San Isidro, Buenos Aires
Argentine footballers
Association football midfielders
Chacarita Juniors footballers
Godoy Cruz Antonio Tomba footballers
Al Nassr FC players
Beerschot A.C. players
Club Atlético Sarmiento footballers
Newell's Old Boys footballers
Club Atlético Colón footballers
S.D. Aucas footballers
Belgian Pro League players
Argentine Primera División players
Ecuadorian Serie A players
Argentine expatriate footballers
Expatriate footballers in Belgium
Expatriate footballers in Saudi Arabia
Expatriate footballers in Ecuador
Saudi Professional League players
Argentine expatriate sportspeople in Saudi Arabia
Sportspeople from Buenos Aires Province